The Milan Indoor, also known under various sponsored names, was a men's professional tennis tournament held from 1978 until 2005. It took placed in Milan, Italy with the exception of three years (1998–2000) when it was held in London, United Kingdom. The event was part of the Grand Prix circuit (1981–89) and ATP Tour (1990–2005) and was played on indoor carpet courts, except for the 2000 edition which was played on an indoor hard court. The most successful singles players were John McEnroe and Boris Becker who both won four titles. Stefan Edberg and Roger Federer won the first singles title of their career at the event. A single female edition of the event was held in 1991, won by Monica Seles. Due to a lack of sponsorship the tournament was replaced on the 2006 ATP Tour by the Zagreb Indoors.

History
The first four editions of the tournament, from 1978 until 1982, were part of the World Championship Tennis circuit, which during that time was incorporated into the Grand Prix calendar. From 1982 through 1989 the event was part of the Super Series tier of the Grand Prix circuit. Initially the tournament was played at the Palazzo dello Sport, near the San Siro stadium, but in 1985 the PalaLido became the event venue after heavy snowfall in January that year had caused the roof of the Palazzo dello Sport to collapse, forcing it to close. In 1987 the tournament moved again, this time to the newly-build Palazzo Trussardi. From 1990 to 1992, during the first years of the ATP Tour, the tournament was part of the World Series, its lowest tier, but in 1993 it was upgraded to the Championship Series tier. In 1991, the Assago Forum became the host of the event, before it moved back again to the Palatrussardi for the 1996 and 1997 editions.

In 1998 the tournament moved to London, England and was played at Battersea Park before moving to the London Arena in 2000 when it became part of the International Series Gold category. Due to the loss of its main sponsor the tournament moved back to its original host city Milan in 2001 where it was held at the PalaLido until its last edition in 2005. John McEnroe and Boris Becker won the singles title four times and the roll of honor contains 10 Grand Slam tournament winners, including Stefan Edberg and Roger Federer, who both won their first career singles title in Milan.

During its history the tournament was known under various, mostly sponsored, names; WCT Milan, the Cuore Tennis Cup, the Fila Trophy, the Stella Artois Indoor, the Muratti Time Indoors, the Italian Indoors, the Guardian Direct Cup, the AXA Cup, the Breil Milano Indoors, the ATP Indesit Milano Indoors, and the Internazionali di Lombardia.

Past finals

Men

Singles

Doubles

Women

Singles

Doubles

See also
Internazionali di Tennis di Bergamo

References

 
ATP Tour
Defunct tennis tournaments in Italy
Sports competitions in Milan
Carpet court tennis tournaments
Indoor tennis tournaments
Grand Prix tennis circuit